Leander Boat Club may refer to one of two clubs:

Leander Club - Great Britain
Leander Boat Club - Canada